This is a list of all genera, species and subspecies of the family Typhlopidae, otherwise referred to as typical blind snakes, or typhlopids. It follows the taxonomy currently provided by ITIS, which is based on the continuing work of Dr. Roy McDiarmid.

 Acutotyphlops
 Acutotyphlops infralabialis
 Acutotyphlops kunuaensis
 Acutotyphlops solomonis
 Acutotyphlops subocularis
 Cyclotyphlops
 Cyclotyphlops deharvengi
 Ramphotyphlops, long-tailed blind snakes
 Ramphotyphlops acuticaudus, Palau blind snake
 Ramphotyphlops affinis
 Ramphotyphlops albiceps
 Ramphotyphlops angusticeps
 Ramphotyphlops australis, southern blindsnake
 Ramphotyphlops batillus
 Ramphotyphlops bituberculatus
 Ramphotyphlops braminus, brahminy blind snake
 Ramphotyphlops broomi
 Ramphotyphlops centralis
 Ramphotyphlops chamodracaena
 Ramphotyphlops cumingii
 Ramphotyphlops depressus
 Ramphotyphlops diversus
 Ramphotyphlops endoterus
 Ramphotyphlops erycinus
 Ramphotyphlops exocoeti, Christmas Island blind snake
 Ramphotyphlops flaviventer
 Ramphotyphlops grypus
 Ramphotyphlops guentheri
 Ramphotyphlops hamatus
 Ramphotyphlops howi
 Ramphotyphlops kimberleyensis
 Ramphotyphlops leptosomus
 Ramphotyphlops leucoproctus
 Ramphotyphlops ligatus
 Ramphotyphlops lineatus
 Ramphotyphlops lorenzi
 Ramphotyphlops margaretae
 Ramphotyphlops micromma
 Ramphotyphlops minimus
 Ramphotyphlops multilineatus
 Ramphotyphlops nigrescens
 Ramphotyphlops olivaceus
 Ramphotyphlops pilbarensis
 Ramphotyphlops pinguis
 Ramphotyphlops polygrammicus
 Ramphotyphlops polygrammicus brongersmai
 Ramphotyphlops polygrammicus elberti
 Ramphotyphlops polygrammicus florensis
 Ramphotyphlops polygrammicus polygrammicus
 Ramphotyphlops polygrammicus undecimlineatus
 Ramphotyphlops proximus
 Ramphotyphlops silvia
 Ramphotyphlops similis
 Ramphotyphlops supranasalis
 Ramphotyphlops tovelli
 Ramphotyphlops troglodytes
 Ramphotyphlops unguirostris
 Ramphotyphlops waitii
 Ramphotyphlops wiedii
 Ramphotyphlops willeyi
 Ramphotyphlops yampiensis
 Ramphotyphlops yirrikalae
 Rhinotyphlops
 Rhinotyphlops acutus
 Rhinotyphlops anomalus
 Rhinotyphlops ataeniatus
 Rhinotyphlops boylei
 Rhinotyphlops caecus
 Rhinotyphlops crossii
 Rhinotyphlops debilis
 Rhinotyphlops erythraeus
 Rhinotyphlops feae
 Rhinotyphlops gracilis
 Rhinotyphlops graueri
 Rhinotyphlops kibarae
 Rhinotyphlops lalandei
 Rhinotyphlops leucocephalus
 Rhinotyphlops lumbriciformis
 Rhinotyphlops newtonii
 Rhinotyphlops pallidus
 Rhinotyphlops praeocularis
 Rhinotyphlops rufescens
 Rhinotyphlops schinzi
 Rhinotyphlops schlegelii
 Rhinotyphlops schlegelii brevis
 Rhinotyphlops schlegelii mucruso
 Rhinotyphlops schlegelii petersii
 Rhinotyphlops schlegelii schlegelii
 Rhinotyphlops scorteccii
 Rhinotyphlops simoni
 Rhinotyphlops somalicus
 Rhinotyphlops stejnegeri
 Rhinotyphlops sudanensis
 Rhinotyphlops unitaeniatus
 Rhinotyphlops wittei
 Typhlops, Blind snakes
 Typhlops andamanensis
 Typhlops angolensis
 Typhlops arenarius
 Typhlops ater
 Typhlops beddomii
 Typhlops bibronii
 Typhlops biminiensis
 Typhlops biminiensis biminiensis
 Typhlops biminiensis paradoxus
 Typhlops bipartitus
 Typhlops bisubocularis
 Typhlops bothriorhynchus
 Typhlops boulengeri
 Typhlops brongersmianus
 Typhlops canlaonensis
 Typhlops capitulatus
 Typhlops cariei
 Typhlops castanotus
 Typhlops catapontus
 Typhlops caymanensis
 Typhlops ceylonicus
 Typhlops coecatus
 Typhlops collaris
 Typhlops comorensis
 Typhlops congestus
 Typhlops conradi
 Typhlops costaricensis
 Typhlops cuneirostris
 Typhlops decorosus
 Typhlops decorsei
 Typhlops depressiceps
 Typhlops diardii
 Typhlops domergnei
 Typhlops dominicanus
 Typhlops dominicanus dominicanus
 Typhlops dominicanus guadeloupensis
 Typhlops elegans
 Typhlops epactius
 Typhlops exiguus
 Typhlops floweri
 Typhlops fornasinii
 Typhlops fredparkeri
 Typhlops giadinhensis
 Typhlops gierrai
 Typhlops gonavensis
 Typhlops granti, Grant's blind snake
 Typhlops grivensis
 Typhlops hectus
 Typhlops hedraeus
 Typhlops hypogius
 Typhlops hypomethes, coastal blindsnake
 Typhlops hypsobothrius
 Typhlops inornatus
 Typhlops jamaicensis
 Typhlops jerdoni
 Typhlops khoratensis
 Typhlops klemmeri
 Typhlops koekkoeki
 Typhlops koshunensis
 Typhlops kraalii
 Typhlops lankaensis
 Typhlops lehneri
 Typhlops leucomelas
 Typhlops leucostictus
 Typhlops lineolatus
 Typhlops loveridgei
 Typhlops lumbricalis
 Typhlops luzonensis
 Typhlops madagascariensis
 Typhlops malcolmi
 Typhlops manilae
 Typhlops manni
 Typhlops marxi
 Typhlops mcdowelli
 Typhlops microstomus
 Typhlops minuisquamus
 Typhlops mirus
 Typhlops monastus
 Typhlops monastus geotomus
 Typhlops monastus monastus
 Typhlops monensis, Mona blind snake
 Typhlops mucronatus
 Typhlops oatesii
 Typhlops obtusus
 Typhlops ocularis
 Typhlops oligolepis
 Typhlops pammeces
 Typhlops paucisquamus
 Typhlops platycephalus, flat-headed blindsnake
 Typhlops platyrhynchus
 Typhlops porrectus
 Typhlops punctatus
 Typhlops punctatus liberiensis
 Typhlops punctatus punctatus
 Typhlops pusillus
 Typhlops reticulatus
 Typhlops reuteri
 Typhlops richardii, Richard's blind snake
 Typhlops rondoensis
 Typhlops rostellatus, Puerto Rican wetland blind snake
 Typhlops ruber
 Typhlops ruficaudus
 Typhlops schmidti
 Typhlops schmidti schmidti
 Typhlops schmidti wilsoni
 Typhlops schmutzi
 Typhlops schwartzi
 Typhlops siamensis
 Typhlops socotranus
 Typhlops steinhausi
 Typhlops sulcatus, sulcate blind snake
 Typhlops syntherus
 Typhlops tasymicris
 Typhlops tenebrarum
 Typhlops tenuicollis
 Typhlops tenuis
 Typhlops tetrathyreus
 Typhlops thurstoni
 Typhlops tindalli
 Typhlops titanops
 Typhlops trangensis
 Typhlops trinitatus, Trinidad worm snake
 Typhlops uluguruensis
 Typhlops unilineatus
 Typhlops veddae
 Typhlops vermicularis
 Typhlops violaceus
 Typhlops wilsoni
 Typhlops yonenagae
 Typhlops zenkeri
 Xenotyphlops
 Xenotyphlops grandidieri

References

 
Typhlopidae
Typhlopidae